The NC State Wolfpack baseball team is the varsity intercollegiate baseball program of North Carolina State University, based in Raleigh, North Carolina, United States. The team has been a member of the Atlantic Coast Conference since the conference's founding in the 1954 season. The program's home venue is Doak Field, which opened in 1966.  Elliott Avent has been the head coach of the team since prior to the 1997 season.  As of the end of the 2015 season, the Wolfpack have appeared in three College World Series and 32 NCAA Tournaments. They have won four ACC Tournament Championships and four ACC Regular Season Championships. As of the 2021 Major League Baseball season, 47 former Wolfpack players have played in Major League Baseball.

History
The baseball program played its first official game against Guilford College in 1894. The program began varsity play in 1903, playing at Riddick Stadium, and in 1907 won its first State Championship. The program competed in each season until 1914, when the program was discontinued for three seasons (1914–1916) before being revived prior to the 1917 season.

The team's nickname was the "Farmers" until autumn 1921, when an alumnus complained that the behavior of some of the school's football players was "as unruly as a pack of wolves."  Subsequently, newspapers began referring to the school's athletic teams as the "Wolfpack."

The program's current venue, Doak Field, opened in 1966.

NC State made its first College World Series appearance in 1968, in the second season of head coach Sammy Esposito's tenure.  In the World Series, the team lost in the semifinals to eventual champion USC.  Since the NCAA Tournament's format was changed in 1999 to include the Super Regional round, NC State has appeared in five Super Regionals, losing to Miami in 2003, Georgia in 2008, and Florida in 2012, beating Rice in 2013, and Arkansas in 2021.

The Wolfpack have hosted five NCAA Regionals, one at Wilson, North Carolina's Fleming Stadium (in 2003) and four at Doak Field (in 2008, 2012, 2013, 2016).

Conference affiliations
Independent − 1903–1913, 1917–1921
Southern Conference − 1922–1953
Atlantic Coast Conference − 1954–present

Venues

Riddick Stadium

Prior to 1966, the team played at Riddick Stadium, which was also home to the NC State football program.

Doak Field

The Wolfpack's home venue is Doak Field, which opened in 1966 and has a capacity of 3,000 spectators.  The field is named for Charles Doak, who was the program's head coach from 1924–1939.

Head coaches
The program's most successful head coach was Sammy Esposito. Esposito coached teams to four ACC regular season championships, three ACC tournament championships, and one College World Series appearance in his 21-year tenure.

Current head coach Elliot Avent is the program's leader in total career victories at NC State, with 951 as of April 25th, 2022.  Avent became the program's winningest coach on May 9, 2010, in a 21–0 NC State win over Towson.  The win was Avent's 514th, putting him past Sammy Esposito on the program's career wins list.

Coach Avent is also the program's longest tenured head coach, with 22 seasons in the position. Vic Sorrell and Sammy Esposito each served as head coach for 21 seasons.